Beryozovsky District may refer to:
Beryozovsky District, Russia, name of several districts in Russia
Berezivskyi Raion, a district of Odessa Oblast, Ukraine
Biaroza Raion, a district of Brest Region, Belarus

District name disambiguation pages